German submarine U-396 was a Type VIIC U-boat of Nazi Germany's Kriegsmarine during World War II.

She carried out five patrols. She did not sink or damage any ships.

She was posted missing since 11 April 1945.

Design
German Type VIIC submarines were preceded by the shorter Type VIIB submarines. U-396 had a displacement of  when at the surface and  while submerged. She had two shafts and two  propellers.

U-396 was fitted with five  torpedo tubes (four fitted at the bow and one at the stern), fourteen torpedoes, one  SK C/35 naval gun, (220 rounds), one  Flak M42 and two twin  C/30 anti-aircraft guns. The boat had a complement of between forty-four and sixty.

Service history
The submarine was laid down on 6 June 1942 at the Howaldtswerke (yard) at Flensburg as yard number 28, launched on 27 August 1943 and commissioned on 16 October under the command of Kapitänleutnant Ernst-Günther Unterhorst.

She served with the 5th U-boat Flotilla from 16 October 1943 and the 1st flotilla from 1 June 1944. She was reassigned to the 11h flotilla on 1 October.

First patrol
The boat departed Kiel on 20 June 1944. On 28 June she was attacked by a British Catalina flying boat of No. 210 Squadron RAF. The only damage was a carbon monoxide leak which was serious enough to cause the submarine to abort her patrol. She arrived at Bergen on 3 July.

Second and third patrols
These two sorties were relatively uneventful.

Fourth patrol
U-396 departed Trondheim on 1 October 1944. She entered the north Atlantic Ocean via the gap between Iceland and the Faroe Islands and sailed southeast of Cape Farewell (Greenland). She returned to Trondheim on 19 December. At 60 days, it was her longest patrol.

Fifth patrol and possible loss
The boat departed Trondheim for Atlantic weather reporting duties on 13 March 1945. It is known that she sailed between the Faroe and Shetland Islands. She was posted missing since 11 April 1945. No conclusive explanation for her loss exists.

45 men were aboard the U-boat; there were no survivors.

Previously recorded fate
U-396 was thought to have been sunk on 23 April 1945 southwest of the Shetland Islands by depth charges dropped by a British B-24 Liberator of No. 86 Squadron RAF. This attack was probably against a 'nonsub' target.

References

Bibliography

External links

German Type VIIC submarines
U-boats commissioned in 1943
U-boats sunk in 1945
1943 ships
Ships built in Kiel
Missing U-boats of World War II
World War II submarines of Germany
U-boats sunk by unknown causes
Maritime incidents in April 1945